Clifton Viaduct is a Grade II listed stone structure crossing the valley of the River Irwell in Clifton, Greater Manchester, and also the Manchester, Bolton and Bury Canal.  It is known locally as the "13 Arches". It is currently disused and closed to the public.

History
The viaduct was constructed in 1846 to carry trains from Manchester to Rossendale along the Manchester, Bury and Rossendale Railway, over the Irwell Valley. It has 13 arches and after crossing the Irwell the railway line used to lead into what was once Clifton Junction railway station. The line was closed in 1966.  The viaduct passes another notable structure, Clifton Aqueduct.

See also

 Listed buildings in Swinton and Pendlebury
 List of railway bridges and viaducts in the United Kingdom
 Philips Park, Whitefield

References

External links
 Historical aerial photograph of the viaduct
 Images of Clifton Aqueduct and the Viaduct
 Distant image of Irwell Valley with the Viaduct in the centre

Grade II listed bridges in Greater Manchester
Bridges completed in 1846
Irwell Valley
Viaducts in England
Buildings and structures in the City of Salford
Former railway bridges in the United Kingdom
Bridges across the River Irwell